Sonal is a given Indian name originating from the Hindu religion. It is a unisex name often nicknamed as “Sona” and means "curious", "golden", or “precious” in Hindi, Marathi, and Gujarati. A similar name is Sonali. It is also a name used in Sri Lanka. People with the name "Sonal" include:

Sonal Chauhan (born 1989), Indian actress
Sonal Mansingh (born 1944), Indian dancer
Sonal Shah (actress) (born 1980), Indian-American actress
Sonal Shah (economist) (born 1968), American economist
Sonal Sehgal (born 1981), Indian actress
Sonal Vengurlekar (born 1993), Indian actress

Indian given names